The Federal College of Education (Technical), Asaba is a federal government higher education institution located in Asaba City, Delta State, Nigeria. It is affiliated to University of Benin (Nigeria) for its degree programmes. The college began in 1987 at the former Asaba Technical College, (ATC) at its temporary site. Asaba is a rapidly developing Urban Centre and the administrative headquarters of Delta State. Currently, the Provost of the Federal College of Education (Technical), Asaba is Josephine Anene-Okakwa.

History 
The Federal College of Education (Technical) Asaba was established in 1987.

Courses 
The institution offers the following courses;

 Agricultural Science
 Agricultural Science and Education
 Business Education
 Computer Science Education/Integrated Science
 Computer Science Education/Mathematics
 Education and Biology
 Education and Chemistry
Education and Integrated Science
Education and Mathematics
Education and Physics
Fine and Applied Art
Home Economics
Integrated Science/Mathematics Education
Integrated Science/Physics
Technical Education
The institution also attaches students to different workplaces in order to gain practical experience through the SIWES programme.

Affiliation 
The institution is affiliated with the University of Benin, Benin City to offer  programmes leading to Bachelors of Science, Education, B.Sc(ed) in;

 Physics Education
 Biology Education
 Chemistry Education
 Mathematics Education
 Integrated Science Education
 Business Education
 Home Economic Education
 Agricultural Science Education
 Industrial Technical Education

References

Education in Delta State
Federal colleges of education in Nigeria
1987 establishments in Nigeria
Educational institutions established in 1987
Asaba